Dabeli, kutchi dabeli or double roti (Devnagari: दाबेली,कच्छी दाबेली) is a popular snack food of India, originating in the Gujarat. It is a sweet snack made by mixing boiled potatoes with a special dabeli masala, putting the mixture in a ladi pav (burger bun), and serving it with chutneys made from tamarind, date, garlic, red chilies and other ingredients. It is garnished with pomegranate and roasted peanuts.

Dabeli literally means "pressed" in Gujarati language. The dish is said to have been created by Keshavji Gabha Chudasama (also known as Kesha Malam), a resident of Mandvi, Kutch, in the 1960s. When he started business he sold dabeli at the price of one anna or six paisa. His shop is still there in Mandvi, run by a later generation of his family. Today, dabeli masala made in the Kutch region are said to be most authentic. Bhuj and Nakhatrana towns of Kutch are also known for authentic dabeli apart from Mandvi.

Preparation
 Combine the dabeli masala, meethi chutney and a little water (approx. 1 tbsp) in a bowl and mix well. 
 Heat the oil in a non-stick pan, add the prepared dabeli masala mixture, mix well and cook on a medium flame for 1 minute, while stirring continuously. 
 The bun is heated on a pan and then it is filled with the filling of boiled potato mixture, dabeli masala and chutney.

Further notes

Dabeli masala, which is the main ingredient of the dish, is readily available in most of the cities all over India, sold under various brand names mainly manufactured and packed in Kutch. The dabeli masala made from Mandvi and Bhuj are preferred by people for their taste and authenticity. This dabeli masala is a dry-paste made from dried red-chillies, black-pepper powder, dried coconut, salt, clove, cinnamon, coriander, cumin, turmeric, elaichi, badiyan, black-salt, tej-patta and other garam masalas is a specially prepared masala. The dabeli masala once made or purchased from shops can be stored and used for over a period of six to twelve months.
Chutney is an essential part of almost all type of Indian cuisine and these type of chutneys can be prepared in advance and stored and used for at least a fortnight.  Now-a-days specially preserved chutney packets are available also in shops in major cities of India and are exported to other countries by some Indian food companies.
 Sev referred above is a type of Indian farsan, which is readily available in farsan shops in all over India and also in other countries, where it is being exported by companies like Haldiram's and others.

Cooking time

With ready-made dabeli masala, chutneys made-in-advance, Sev readily available, roasted pea-nuts, pomegranate and boiled potato, dabeli hardly takes 8–10 minutes to be prepared and as such has become a popular Indian fast food.
If you don't have ready-made items available, Dabeli total cooking may take up to 40 minutes depending on what ingredients you have available.

Popularity

Dabeli today is famous not only in Kutch and Gujarat but also throughout Maharashtra, parts of Telangana, Karnataka, Rajasthan and many other States of India.  Dabeli stalls can be found in metropolitan cities like Ahmedabad, Mumbai, Nasik, Bangalore, Pune, Delhi, Nagpur, Hyderabad, Nizamabad, Raipur, Bilaspur, Jabalpur, Indore, Bhopal, Udaipur, Jaipur, Aurangabad, etc. besides all major cities, towns and tourist spots of Gujarat.

Other common names for Kutchi Dabeli are  Kutchi burger or Desi burger  and Kutchi double roti or "Kachchhi Dabeli"

Other dishes of the Kutch or Kutchi cuisine like, Kutchi Samosa, Kutchi Khaja, Kutchi Pakwan, Kutchi Khichdi, etc.

See also

 List of Indian snack foods
 List of potato dishes
 List of sandwiches

References

Indian fast food
Indian snack foods
Gujarati cuisine
Kutchi cuisine
Potato dishes
Sandwiches